Hüngsberg is a locality in the municipality of Windhagen in the district of Neuwied in Rhineland-Palatinate, Germany.

Villages in Rhineland-Palatinate